Hoplostethus rifti is a member of the family Trachichthyidae It is found in the Western Indian Ocean around northern tip of Madagascar at depths of up to . It can reach sizes of up to  SL.

References

External links
 

rifti
Fish described in 1986
Fish of the Indian Ocean